Mauricio Hadad (born 7 December 1971) is a former tennis player from Colombia and former captain of the Colombia Davis Cup Team.

Hadad is of Lebanese background. The right-hander turned pro in 1988 and reached his highest individual ranking on the ATP Tour on September 11, 1995, when he became World No. 78.  He won the ATP Bermuda Open in 1995. He is the only Colombian tennis player in history to have won an ATP Tour title in singles. His best performance at a Grand Slam came at the 1996 Australian Open and the 1995 U.S. Open where he made it to the third round.

Hadad participated in 20 Davis Cup ties for Colombia from 1989–2001 and holds the record for most wins with 35 victories, posting a 23-5 record in singles and a 12-6 record in doubles. Hadad had also been the last Colombian player in history to break into the top 100 in 1995 until Alejandro Falla did so in 2007.

He became the captain of the Colombia Davis Cup Team from 2013 until 2016. He has been credited with opening ground to the best generation of Colombian tennis players such as Alejandra Falla, Santiago Giraldo, Alejandro Gonzalez, Robert Farah and Juan Sebastian Cabal.

Hadad coached former World No. 1 Russian professional tennis player Maria Sharapova leading her to her first Wimbledon title in 2004 at the age of 17. He also coached Heather Watson leading her to her first title and is currently the coach of British tennis player Laura Robson.

ATP career finals

Singles: 2 (1 title, 1 runner-up)

Doubles: 1 (1 runner-up)

ATP Challenger and ITF Futures finals

Singles: 17 (13–4)

Doubles: 6 (5–1)

Performance timeline

Singles

References

External links
 
 
 

1971 births
Living people
Sportspeople from Cali
Colombian people of Lebanese descent
Colombian male tennis players
Colombian tennis coaches
Sportspeople of Lebanese descent
20th-century Colombian people